Torquigener marleyi is a species of pufferfish in the family Tetraodontidae. It is a marine species known only from South Africa, where it occurs near the Tugela River in KwaZulu-Natal. FishBase lists this species as a synonym of Torquigener balteus, although ITIS and WoRMS list it as a valid species.

References 

marleyi